The Co-Optimists is a stage variety revue that opened in London on 27 June 1921. The show was devised by Davy Burnaby. The piece was a co-operative venture by what The Times called "a group of well-known musical comedy and variety artists" presenting "an all-star 'pierrot' entertainment in the West-end." It opened at the small Royalty Theatre and soon transferred to the much larger Palace Theatre. The show ran initially for 500 performances; it was completely rewritten and revived at regular intervals to keep it fresh. The final edition, beginning in November 1926 and closing on 4 August 1927, was the 13th version.

The Co-Optimists provided an early platform for the comedy actor and singer Stanley Holloway and brought him wider notice throughout the UK. In 1929, the revue was made into a feature film with the same name, again starring Holloway. In December 1926, Lee DeForest filmed Betty Chester singing "Pig-Tail Alley" in a short film, Betty Chester, the Well-Known Co-Optimist Star, made in his Phonofilm sound-on-film process.

Music and lyrics
Melville Gideon, Clifford Grey, Irving Berlin, Philip Braham, Vivian Ellis, William Helmore, Ivy St Helier, Laddie Cliff, Austin Melford, Greatrex Newman, Arthur Schwartz, Clifford Seyler.

Stage artists
George K. Arthur, Davy Burnaby, Betty Chester, Charles Childerstone, Gilbert Childs, Laddie Cliff, Mimi Crawford, Melville Gideon, Stanley Holloway, Mary Leigh, Elsa MacFarlane, Austin Melford, Phyllis Monkman, Herbert Mundin, Elsie Randolph, Cyril Ritchard, Babs Valerie, Clifford Witley.

Film artists
Davy Burnaby, Phyllis Monkman, Gilbert Childs, Laddie Cliff, Melville Gideon, Stanley Holloway, Betty Chester, Elsa MacFarlane, Peggy Petronella, and Harry S. Pepper.

References

External links
 The Co-Optimists on British Pathé news
 
 Betty Chester, the Well-Known Co-Optimist Star at IMDB
 The Co-Optimists The Guide to Musical Theatre - List of artists and credits
 The Co-Optimists at NY Times Movies page

Revues
1921 musicals